Merner is a surname. Notable people with the surname include:

Jonathan Joseph Merner (1864–1929), Canadian politician
Samuel Merner (1823–1908), Canadian businessman and politician

See also
Marner